Us Three is an album by American jazz pianist Horace Parlan featuring performances recorded and released on the Blue Note label in 1960.

Reception
The Allmusic review by Thom Jurek awarded the album 4 stars and stated: "The proceedings here are straight-ahead with some cool soul-jazz touches... This is a fine effort from an underappreciated trio".

Track listing
All compositions by Horace Parlan except as indicated

 "Us Three" - 4:33
 "I Want to Be Loved" (Savannah Churchill) - 4:50
 "Come Rain or Come Shine" (Harold Arlen, Johnny Mercer) -  6:26
 "Wadin'" - 5:52
 "The Lady Is a Tramp" (Lorenz Hart, Richard Rodgers) - 7:09
 "Walkin'" (Richard Carpenter) -  7:05
 "Return Engagement" - 4:48

Personnel
Horace Parlan - piano
George Tucker - bass
Al Harewood - drums

References

Blue Note Records albums
Horace Parlan albums
1960 albums
Albums produced by Alfred Lion
Albums recorded at Van Gelder Studio